The voiceless alveolar lateral fricative is a type of consonantal sound, used in some spoken languages.

The symbol  is called "belted l" and is distinct from "l with tilde", which transcribes a different sound - the velarized (or pharynɡealized) alveolar lateral approximant, often called "dark L".

Some scholars also posit the voiceless alveolar lateral approximant distinct from the fricative.

Features 
Features of the voiceless alveolar lateral fricative:

Occurrence 
The sound is fairly common among indigenous languages of the Americas, such as Nahuatl and Navajo, and in North Caucasian languages, such as Avar. It is also found in African languages, such as Zulu, and Asian languages, such as Chukchi, some Yue dialects like Taishanese, the Hlai languages of Hainan, and several Formosan languages and dialects in Taiwan.

The sound is rare in European languages outside the Caucasus, but it is found notably in Welsh in which it is written . It was also found in certain dialects of Lithuanian Yiddish.

The phoneme  was also found in the most ancient Hebrew speech of the Ancient Israelites. The orthography of Biblical Hebrew, however, did not directly indicate the phoneme since it and several other phonemes of Ancient Hebrew did not have a grapheme of their own. In all Jewish reading traditions,  and  have merged completely, but in Samaritan Hebrew  has instead merged into .

The  sound is also found in two of the constructed languages invented by J. R. R. Tolkien, Sindarin (inspired by Welsh) and Quenya (inspired by Finnish, Ancient Greek, and Latin). In Sindarin, it is written as  initially and  medially and finally, and in Quenya, it appears only initially and is written .

Dental or denti-alveolar

Alveolar

Alveolar approximant

Semitic languages 

Among Semitic languages, the sound still exists in contemporary Soqotri and Mehri. In Ge'ez, it is written with the letter Śawt.

Capital letter

Since the IPA letter "ɬ" has been adopted into the standard orthographies for many native North American languages, a capital letter L with belt "Ɬ" was requested by academics and added to the Unicode Standard version 7.0 in 2014 at U+A7AD.

See also 
 Voiced dental and alveolar lateral fricatives
 Voiceless alveolar lateral affricate
 Index of phonetics articles

Notes

References 

 
 
 
 
 
 
 
 
 
 
 
 
 
 
 
 

 
 
 
 
 
 Official database:

Further reading
Beth am y llall? John Wells's phonetic blog, 1 July 2009. (How the British phonetician John Wells would teach the sound .)
 A chance to share more than just some sounds of languages walesonline.co.uk, 3 May 2012 (Article by Dr Paul Tench including information on transcribing  in Chadic languages.)

External links
 
 

Alveolar consonants
Fricative consonants
Lateral consonants
Pulmonic consonants
Voiceless oral consonants